Insulin-like growth factor 2 mRNA-binding protein 3 is a protein that in humans is encoded by the IGF2BP3 gene.

The protein encoded by this gene is primarily found in the nucleolus, where it can bind to the 5' UTR of the insulin-like growth factor II leader 3 mRNA and may repress translation of insulin-like growth factor II during late development. 

The encoded protein contains several KH domains, which are important in RNA binding and are known to be involved in RNA synthesis and metabolism. A pseudogene exists on chromosome 7, and there are putative pseudogenes on other chromosomes.

See also
 IGF2BP1
 IGF2BP2

References

Further reading